Tomer Eliyahu (born 25 February 1975) is a retired Israeli professional association football player. Known as a journeyman,  Eliyahu played more than 350 matches in thirteen seasons in Israel's Ligat ha'Al filling in as both a defender and a midfielder.

Biography

Early life 
Eliyahu started playing football at age 7 with Hapoel Tel Aviv. He was brought up to Hapoel's first team by then manager, Moshe Sinai.

Professional career 
After the 2001/02 season, Eliyahu signed a two-year contract worth US $110,000 per season.

Bnei Sakhnin 
After Ironi Rishon LeZion was relegated to the Liga Leumit, Eliyahu signed a contract with Bnei Sakhnin. During the 2004/05 season, a small fight broke out after a 2-0 loss to Hapoel Tel Aviv. In the ensuing violence, the referee, Assaf Keinan was attacked and a police officer was stabbed. In an interview after the incident, Eliyahu became extremely vocal about an underlying anti-semitism toward Bnei Sakhnin by referees as the team was an Arab team. Eliyahu said that he had not experienced such disdain from match officials at any of his previous clubs.  After two seasons with Bnei Sakhnin, Eliyahu attracted interest from Beitar Jerusalem but opted to sign with Hapoel Acre of the Liga Leumit.

Hakoah Amidar/Ramat Gan 
After one full season in Ramat Gan, Eliyahu was forced to retire due to back problems.

Honours

With Bnei Sakhnin
 State Cup: 2003/04

With Hapoel Acre
 Toto Cup (Leumit): 2005/06

With Hakoah Maccabi Amidar/Ramat Gan
 Liga Leumit: 2007/08

Statistics

References

Footnotes

1975 births
Living people
Israeli Jews
Israeli footballers
Association football defenders
Association football midfielders
Hapoel Tel Aviv F.C. players
Hapoel Rishon LeZion F.C. players
Hapoel Kfar Saba F.C. players
Bnei Sakhnin F.C. players
Hapoel Acre F.C. players
Hapoel Be'er Sheva F.C. players
Hakoah Maccabi Amidar Ramat Gan F.C. players
Liga Leumit players
Israeli Premier League players
Footballers from Bat Yam